The Volleyball 2017–18 V.Premier League Men's was the 24th tournament of the V.League which were be held from October 21, 2017 – March 18, 2018.

Regular Round

Regular round standing procedure
 Total number of victories (matches won, matched lost)
 In the event of a tie, the following first tiebreaker will apply: The teams will be ranked by the most point gained per match as follows:
Match won 3–0 or 3–1: 3 points for the winner, 0 points for the loser
Match won 3–2: 2 points for the winner, 1 point for the loser
Match forfeited: 3 points for the winner, 0 points (0–25, 0–25, 0–25) for the loser
 If teams are still tied after examining the number of victories and points gained, then the FIVB will examine the results in order to break the tie in the following order:
Set quotient: if two or more teams are tied on the number of points gained, they will be ranked by the quotient resulting from the division of the number of all set won by the number of all sets lost.
Points quotient: if the tie persists based on the set quotient, the teams will be ranked by the quotient resulting from the division of all points scored by the total of points lost during all sets.
If the tie persists based on the point quotient, the tie will be broken based on the team that won the match of the Round Robin Phase between the tied teams. When the tie in point quotient is between three or more teams, these teams ranked taking into consideration only the matches involving the teams in question.

Standings

Leg 1
 All times are Japan Standard Time (UTC+09:00).

Week 1

|}

Week 2

|}

Week 3

|}

Week 4

|}

Leg 2
 All times are Japan Standard Time (UTC+09:00).

Week 1

|}

Week 2

|}

Week 3

|}

Week 4

|}

Leg 3
 All times are Japan Standard Time (UTC+09:00).

Week 1

|}

Week 2

|}

Week 3

|}

Week 4

|}

Final six round

Final six standing procedure
Ranking points of regular round; 1st place – 5 point, 2nd place – 4 point, 3rd place – 3 point, 4th place – 2 point, 5th place – 1 point, 6th place – 0 point
 Total points (match points of final 6 and the ranking points of regular round)
 The rank of regular round
 Match won 3–0 or 3–1: 3 points for the winner, 0 points for the loser
 Match won 3–2: 2 points for the winner, 1 point for the loser
 Match forfeited: 3 points for the winner, 0 points (0–25, 0–25, 0–25) for the loser

Standings

Results

|}

Final Round

Final 3

|}

|}
1Toyoda Gosei Trefuerza won the golden set 26–24

Final

|}

|}

Final standing

See also
 2017–18 V.Premier League Women's

References

External links
 Official website 

V.Premier League Men
V.Premier League Men
Men's
2017 in Japanese sport
2018 in Japanese sport